Scarperia is a frazione of the comune (municipality) of Scarperia e San Piero, located in the Metropolitan City of Florence, in Tuscany, Italy, about  north of Florence. It was an independent comune until 1 January 2014.

Main sights

 Chiesa di San Gavino al Cornocchio
 Chiesa di San Giovanni Battista a Senni
 Prepositura dei Santi Jacopo e Filippo
 Oratorio della Madonna dei Terremoti
 Oratorio della Madonna del Vivaio
 Cappella della Madonna di Piazza
 Pieve di Santa Maria a Fagna
 Palazzo dei Vicari (Scarperia)
 Villa Panna
 Villa Il Torrino

Traditions and sport 

Scarperia is renowned for the production of ferri taglienti (literally "cutting tools": knives, blades, razors, scissors), which is the main and most specialised craftsmanship in the area.Every year, the village celebrates the anniversary of its founding, during the event called Diotto.The Mugello Circuit, home to the Grand Prix motorcycle racing, is located in the near surroundings of the town.

References

External links 

Cities and towns in Tuscany
Scarperia e San Piero
Frazioni of the Province of Florence